The soundtrack album for The Devil Wears Prada was released by Warner Brothers/WEA on July 11, 2006. It includes popular songs by U2 and Madonna, and work by Alanis Morissette and Jamiroquai, many of which were used for significant scenes in the film. The film also contains the Blackliquid Remix to DJ Colette's hit single, "Feelin' Hypnotized". However, "Suddenly I See" by KT Tunstall, which plays over the opening credits, is not included on the album, nor are some other tracks like Bitter:Sweet's "Our Remains" and Madonna's "Jump", to the disappointment of many buyers. It enjoyed some popularity nevertheless.

Rounding out the album is a suite of original music composed for the movie by Theodore Shapiro.

Track listing
 
"Vogue", Madonna - 5:19
"Bittersweet Faith", Bitter:Sweet - 4:20
"City of Blinding Lights", U2 - 5:44
"Seven Days in Sunny June", Jamiroquai - 4:00
"Crazy (James Michael Mix)", Alanis Morissette - 3:38
"Beautiful", Moby - 3:10
"How Come", Ray LaMontagne - 4:28
"Sleep", Azure Ray - 5:00
"Feelin' Hypnotized (Blackliquid Remix)", DJ Colette - 4:55
"Tres Tres Chic", Mocean Worker - 3:39
"Here I Am (Kaskade Remix)", David Morales feat. Tamra Keenan - 3:38
"Suite from The Devil Wears Prada", Theodore Shapiro - 6:24

The Devil Wears Prada Orchestral Oscar Edition
All score selections composed by Theodore Shapiro.

"She's On Her Way" - 02:00
"End Of The Interview" - 00:24
"Up And Down" - 00:39
"Go To Calvin Klein, Hermes And Others" - 01:01
"You're Already Late" - 01:06
"Intensive Week" - 01:25
"A Plane For Miranda" - 01:21
"She Hates Me, Nigel!" - 01:02
"The New Look Of Andrea" - 02:24
"James Holt's Collection" - 01:42
"The Book To My Home Tonight Andrea!" - 00:32
"In Miranda's House" - 02:03
"Andrea Goes Upstairs" - 00:48
"The Harry Potter Manuscript" - 02:07
"Meet You At The St. Regis" - 01:05
"That's All!" - 00:29
"The Gala Preparation" - 00:44
"You're... You're A Vision!" - 01:14
"Just For One Drink" - 01:14
"You Look Very Pretty" - 00:55
"Emily's Accident" - 01:16
"Is There Anything Else I Can Do?" - 01:28
"Christian And Andrea" - 01:17
"At The Hotel" - 00:34
"Andrea Find The Mockup" - 01:14
"Andrea Can't Speak To Miranda" - 01:43
"The New President: Jacqueline Follet" - 02:48
"Miranda And Andrea" - 02:12
"Nate And Andrea" - 00:56
"You Must Have Done Something Right" - 01:02
"Go" - 03:14
"End Titles" - 01:58

Songs featured in film but not included on soundtrack album
 "Blue at Couch" - Kenji Nakamura
 "Dance Floor (Le D Remix)" - The Tao of Groove
 "Every Angel" - The Push Stars
 "I Don't Love Anyone" - Belle & Sebastian
 "Jump" - Madonna
 "Les Yeux Ouverts (Dream a Little Dream)" - The Beautiful South
 "Our Remains" - Bitter:Sweet
 "Suddenly I See" - KT Tunstall
 "Time Will Tell" - The Good Listeners
 "Vato Loco" - Latin Soul Syndicate
 "Yeah Yeah Brother" - Black Grape
 "All Kinds of Time" - Fountains of Wayne

Credits

Technical

Producer:
Engineer: Chris Fogel
Art director: Mathieu Bitton
Orchestration: Pete Anthony, Jon Kull
Mastering: Patricia Sullivan Fourstar

Performance

(On "Suite from The Devil Wears Prada")

Contractors: Sandy DeCrescent, Peter Rotter
Conductor: Pete Anthony
Bass: Neil Stubenhaus
Guitar: George Doering
Drums: Greg Bissonette
Percussion: Michael Fisher

References

External links
Official site
The Devil Wears Prada soundtrack questions, answers and other music information

2006 soundtrack albums
Comedy film soundtracks
Drama film soundtracks